Stephen Otto Sinding (born 22 July 1951) is a Norwegian luger, born in Oslo. He competed in at the 1972 Winter Olympics in Sapporo, where he placed 22nd in singles, and 14th in doubles together with Christian Strøm.

References

External links

1951 births
Living people
Sportspeople from Oslo
Norwegian male lugers
Olympic lugers of Norway
Lugers at the 1972 Winter Olympics